{{Infobox film
| name           = Lucky You
| image          = Lucky you.jpg
| caption        = Theatrical release poster| director       = Curtis Hanson
| producer       = Denise Di NoviCarol Fenelon
| screenplay     = Curtis HansonEric Roth
| story          = Eric Roth
| starring       = Eric BanaDrew BarrymoreRobert DuvallDebra Messing
| music          = Christopher Young
| cinematography = Peter Deming
| editing        = William KerrCraig Kitson
| studio         = Village Roadshow PicturesFlower FilmsDi Novi PicturesDeuce Three Productions
| distributor    = Warner Bros
| released       = 
| runtime        = 124 minutes
| country        = United States
| language       = English
| budget         = $55 million
| gross          = $8.4 million
}}Lucky You is a 2007 American drama film directed by Curtis Hanson, and starring Eric Bana, Drew Barrymore and Robert Duvall. The film was shot on location in Las Vegas. The screenplay was by Hanson and Eric Roth, but the film was partially inspired by George Stevens' 1970 film The Only Game in Town.

The film was a box-office bomb, only grossing $8.4 million against a $55 million budget.

Plot
In 2003, Huck Cheever is a young and talented poker player in Las Vegas haunted by his relationship with his estranged father, L.C. Cheever, a two-time World Series of Poker Champion. Huck is a regular in Vegas poker rooms but needs $10,000 to get a seat in the World Series of Poker Main Event.

After a good night at the Bellagio hotel's poker room, Huck goes to a party and meets aspiring singer Billie Offer, who has just arrived in town. Billie's older sister Suzanne warns her that Huck is "hustle 10, commitment zero." Back at the Bellagio, Huck is doing well at the tables before L.C. returns to town from the South of France. Huck greets his father coldly. The two play heads-up.

Loan shark Roy Durucher tells Huck that he plays poker as well as anybody, except for his reputation as a "blaster" (not patient enough) who always goes for broke. Roy proposes to stake Huck in the $10,000 main-event with a 60% (Roy) — 40% (Huck) split of any winnings, but Huck refuses. After failing to borrow money from his friend Jack, Huck goes to Suzanne's place hoping for a loan. Instead he runs into Billie, who gets a call confirming that she has landed a job singing at a club.

Huck proposes a celebration and at Binion's Horseshoe he shows her how to play poker. L.C. arrives and shows Huck a wedding ring of Huck's late mother's that Huck had pawned and that L.C. has redeemed. Huck loses his winnings. Over dinner, he explains to Billie that his father stole from his mother before leaving her. Huck says his father taught him how to play on the kitchen table with "pennies, nickels, and dimes." They make love after dinner. As Billie sleeps, Huck steals money from Billie's purse.

Huck plays in a "super satellite" for his entry to the main event. He appears to have the seat won, but a misdeal costs him. Roy agrees to stake Huck and even gives him an extra $1200 so that he can repay Billie. He apologizes to her, saying he feels they have a chance at something special. They later run into L.C., who wins all of Huck's stake money for the World Series in a quick game of guts.

Billie holds the stopwatch in a golfing marathon that Huck must complete in 3 hours to win a bet. She declines to cheat for him when he finishes two seconds too late. Huck gets a black eye when Roy's thugs toss him into his empty pool. They warn him to return the $11,200 stake that he owes to Roy or get a seat in the World Series within 48 hours. When Huck goes to Suzanne's apartment looking for Billie, he learns Billie has gone home to Bakersfield. Huck sells the wedding ring to his father for $500, and makes the 10 grand playing poker in one night to buy a seat in the World Series. Huck travels to Bakersfield to tell Billie that he meant what he said when he felt they had a chance at something special.

Back in Vegas, having found the entry money, Huck enters the World Series. He and his father both advance to the final table of nine. Billie looks on from the audience as Huck and L.C. have a showdown. Huck deliberately folds a winning hand, going out in third place.  A few minutes later, L.C. gets rivered and goes out in second place, losing the title to Jason Keyes who had "won his entry in an online satellite" (a nod to Chris Moneymaker, who did win the 2003 Main Event after a similar entry to the tournament).

After the tournament, L.C. offers his son a one-on-one rematch, playing only for pennies, nickels, and dimes. Their relationship is restored, as is Huck's and Billie's in the final scene.

Cast
 Eric Bana as Huck Cheever
 Drew Barrymore as Billie Offer
 Robert Duvall as L.C. Cheever
 Debra Messing as Suzanne Offer
 Robert Downey Jr. as Telephone Jack
 Horatio Sanz as Ready Eddie
 Jean Smart as Michelle Carson
 Kelvin Han Yee as Chico Bahn
 Michael Shannon as Ray
 Danny Hoch as Bobby Basketball
 Evan Jones as Jason Keyes
 Phyllis Somerville as Pawnbroker

Poker players
Many of the players seen are actual poker pros. They include:

Three others featured in the film play fictional characters. They are:

 Jennifer Harman as Shannon Kincaid
 John Hennigan as Ralph Kaczynski
 David Oppenheim as Josh Cohen

World Series of Poker

 Host Jack Binion
 Tournament Director Matt Savage

Production
Director Curtis Hanson developed the film with his producing partner Carol Fenelon, who was a regular competitor in poker tournaments. Hanson said, "Part of the reason for wanting to make the movie was that the poker world was different, interesting, and we had an affinity for it. But the other part of it was the emotional thing. The skills at the table — and in the movie business — are different from the qualities that you want running your personal life. That single-mindedness, the aggression, the duplicity or bluffing or whatever you want to call it, the lack of sympathy — as [Billie] says."

Eric Bana was cast in the lead role in September 2004. Drew Barrymore was cast in January 2005, and Debra Messing was cast that February. Doyle Brunson served as a poker consultant on the film. Eric Bana and Robert Duvall were coached for months by Brunson on how to play like professional poker players. Matt Savage served as a tournament consultant, while Jason Lester served as a consultant on scenes involving the Main Event championship.
   
Principal photography began on March 28, 2005, in Las Vegas, Nevada, where a majority of filming took place. Filming took place over nine days in the parking lot of Dino's Lounge on South Las Vegas Boulevard. A set was built on a soundstage in Los Angeles, California, which was used for interior scenes of the bar. Other filming locations in Las Vegas included the fountains of the Bellagio resort, Binion's Gambling Hall and Hotel, and the Jockey Club timeshare on the Las Vegas Strip.

In April 2005, scenes were filmed at Summerlin's Bear's Best Golf Club, and at Tiffany's Cafe inside the White Cross Drugs store. Later that month, filming took place at the Silverton Casino Lodge's 117,000-gallon aquatic tank, where Debra Messing spent 16 hours filming a scene dressed as a mermaid in the casino's mermaid show. The scene was cut from the film. Filming also took place at the Cosmopolitan resort, which was under construction at the time. In early May 2005, filming took place at a Summerlin condominium complex and then resumed at the White Cross drugstore. Filming was scheduled to conclude in Las Vegas on May 5, 2005, and then continue in California for a few months.

The filmmakers wanted to film at the Bellagio's poker room, but it had been renovated since 2003, the year that the film's story took place. Instead, an exact replica of the original poker room was constructed on a soundstage in Los Angeles. At the time, the Bellagio was auctioning items from the old poker room, including furniture and chandeliers, all of which was purchased by the production crew to help recreate the original poker room. A replica of a multi-purpose gambling room from Binion's Gambling Hall was also created in Los Angeles.

Music
The soundtrack to Lucky You was released on April 24, 2007.

"Huck's Tune" was written specifically for the film and later released on Bob Dylan's The Bootleg Series Vol. 8: Tell Tale Signs: Rare and Unreleased 1989–2006 compilation album.

 Release 
The film was initially set for release on December 16, 2005. However, the film sat on the shelf for two years and went through numerous release date changes as Warner Bros. mandated a half-dozen different cuts of the film in response to negative test screenings. In January 2007, the film's eventual release date was unveiled to be May 4, 2007.

Reception
Opening the same weekend as Spider-Man 3, the film debuted with $2.7 million in ticket sales; the lowest saturated opening week since 1982. It finished its theatrical run with $8,382,477 in total worldwide revenue.

The film received generally negative reviews from critics. It holds a 28% approval rating based on 141 reviews on Rotten Tomatoes. The site's consensus states: "Lucky You tries to combine a romantic story with the high-stakes world of poker, but comes up with an empty hand."

Much of the criticism focused on the film's pacing and poker scenes. A.O. Scott of The New York Times said, "Even though it is sometimes dull and generally thin, there is something winning about the movie’s genial lack of ambition. It’s a nickel-ante fable of lessons learned and chances taken set in the world of high-stakes competitive poker. The sense of disappointment that lingers afterward may result from inflated expectations, since this is a small picture with some big names attached to it." IGN'' opined the relationship between Huck and Billie is unconvincing and that the film works better as a father-son drama.

Eric Bana was nominated for the Australian Film Institute International Award for Best Actor.

See also
 List of films set in Las Vegas

References

External links 
 
 

2007 films
2007 drama films
American drama films
Films scored by Christopher Young
Films directed by Curtis Hanson
Films produced by Denise Di Novi
Films set in the Las Vegas Valley
Films set in 2003
Films about poker
Films with screenplays by Eric Roth
Village Roadshow Pictures films
2000s English-language films
2000s American films